Csenge Mária Bácskay (born 4 April 2003) is a Hungarian artistic gymnast and the 2018 Youth Olympic silver medalist on vault.  Additionally she was a member of the team who won bronze at the 2020 European Championships.

Early life 
Csenge Bácskay was born in Budapest, Hungary on 4 April 2003 to Zsolt Bácskay and Barbara Bácskayné Abonyi.  She has two younger siblings.

Gymnastics career

Junior

2014–2016
In 2014 Bácskay competed at the Gym Festival Trnava where she helped Hungary finish fourth in the Youth Team final and individually she finished eighth in the all-around.  In 2016 Bácskay competed at the Olympic Hopes Cup where she finished nineteenth in the all-around and eighth in the balance beam finals.  Later that year she competed at the Eva Kanyo Cup where she finished fourth among the Espoirs in the all-around and won silver on the vault, gold on uneven bars, and bronze on balance beam and floor exercise.  She also competed at the Győr Trophy where she placed seventh in the all-around and second on floor exercise.

2017 
In April 2017 Bácskay competed at the Elek Matolay Memorial where she placed first in the all-around, on balance beam, and on floor exercise and she placed second on vault.  In May she represented Hungary at International GymSport where she placed fourth in the all-around but won gold on vault. In June she competed at Gym Festival Trnava where she placed sixth in the all-around, second on vault, and third on floor exercise.  Later in the summer Bácskay competed at the Slovakian Junior Friendly where Hungary won the gold in the team event.  In July she competed at the 2017 European Youth Olympic Festival where Hungary placed fourth in the team final and individually Bácskay placed eighth on vault and fourth on floor.  In November she competed at the Olympic Hopes Cup where she placed eighteenth.  She ended the year competing at the Hungarian Master Championships where she placed eleventh in the all-around, second on vault, and sixth on floor.

2018
Bácskay started the 2018 season competing at Gymnasiade where she finished seventh in the all-around, second on vault behind Anastasia Bachynska of the Ukraine, and seventh on uneven bars and balance beam.  In August Bácskay represented Hungary at the 2018 European Championships.  She qualified to the vault final and finished in sixth place.  In October Bácskay represented Hungary at the 2018 Youth Olympic Games.  She qualified to the all-around and vault finals.  In the all-around final she placed 14th.  In the vault final Bácskay won the silver medal behind Giorgia Villa of Italy and ahead of Emma Spence of Canada.

Senior

2019
Bácskay turned senior in 2019.  She competed at the Hungarian National League Championships  in March where she placed first on vault, fourth on uneven bars and floor exercise, and ninth on balance beam. Bácskay made her international debut at the Doha World Cup where she finished 20th in vault qualification, 12th in balance beam qualification, and 23rd in floor exercise qualification.  In April Bácskay competed at the 2019 European Championships.  During qualifications she placed tenth on vault, becoming the second reserve for the final.  She finished thirty-first on balance beam.

In September Bácskay competed at the Szombathely World Cup where she qualified to the vault final.  During event finals she placed seventh on vault.

2020 
While most competitions were canceled or postponed due to the COVID-19 pandemic, the Szombathely Challenge Cup was held in October which Bácskay competed at.  She qualified to the vault, uneven bars, and balance beam finals.  She finished sixth in the vault event final, eighth on uneven bars, and fourth on balance beam.

In December Bácskay competed at the European Championships.  During qualifications she helped Hungary qualify third to the team final and individually she qualified to the vault final.  During the team final Hungary won the bronze medal behind the Ukraine and Romania.  During the vault event final she finished in fourth place.

2021 
In April Bácskay competed at the European Championships where she qualified to the all-around and vault finals.  She finished 17th in the all-around final and sixth on vault.  The following week Bácskay announced that she had verbally committed to compete for the Nebraska Cornhuskers gymnastics team.

Bácskay competed at the Cairo World Challenge Cup where she won the bronze medal on vault behind Nancy Taman and Bianka Schermann.  Additionally she finished fourth on the uneven bars and sixth on balance beam.  Bácskay next competed at the Osijek World Challenge Cup where she successfully competed her Yurchenko 1.5 twist and Tsukahara layout full to win the vault title.  At the Koper Challenge Cup she won silver on vault and at the Mersin Challenge Cup she won gold on vault and bronze on balance beam.  Counting two wins and one second place finish, Bácskay won the 2020–21 World Challenge Cup series title on vault, finishing five points ahead of Tjaša Kysselef.

In October Bácskay competed at the 2021 World Championships.  She qualified to the vault final and was initially the first reserve for the all-around final; she was called-up to compete after Hitomi Hatakeda withdrew due to injury.  During the all-around final she finished in 21st place and during the vault final she placed fifth.  In November Bácskay signed her National Letter of Intent to compete for the Nebraska Cornhuskers.

2022
Bácskay started her season at the Doha World Cup, where she won the silver medal on vault behind Oksana Chusovitina and placed eighth on the balance beam. She also took the silver on vault behind Chusovitina at the Baku World Cup.

At the European Championships in Munich, Bácskay helped Hungary qualify to the team final, where they finished seventh. She was also the first reserve for the vault final.

Competitive history

References

External links 

 

2003 births
Living people
Hungarian female artistic gymnasts
Gymnasts at the 2018 Summer Youth Olympics
Gymnasts from Budapest
Nebraska Cornhuskers women's gymnasts
21st-century Hungarian women